NBCUniversal Archives offers access to years worth of footage from NBCUniversal and its owned-and-operated stations.  With headquarters in 30 Rockefeller Plaza, the Archives contain everything from rare, award-winning footage, to 3D graphics produced by NBC Artworks.  NBCUniversal Archives licenses archival and stock footage owned by NBCUniversal properties.

About 
NBCUniversal Archives is the footage licensing division of NBCUniversal located at 30 Rockefeller Center in New York City. Expanding from the existing NBC News Archives, NBCUniversal Archives was launched in February 2011 and licenses footage online at NBCUniversalArchives.com and offline from NBC News, NBC Sports, NBC Entertainment, Universal Studios, Universal Pictures, Telemundo, NBC Photobank, The Weather Channel, NBC Radio, NBC Artworks, and more.

Website 
Launched in 2011, NBCUniversalArchives.com is a website that utilizes a digital delivery system which allows clients to screen footage, search the rich text database, download previews and immediately clip and make credit card purchases online. The website is updated daily with breaking news stories and archival footage as it is being digitized.

Awards 
In early 2011, NBC News was named one of the top 100 businesses that have the distinction of creating business value through the effective and innovative use of information technology by CIO Magazine. This is the first time that NBC News has made CIO's annual list, showing how a news broadcast organization can develop unique value from its assets.

References

External links 
 NBCUniversal Archives
 NBC News Archives IMDB
 NBCUniversal Archives IMDB

Film production
NBCUniversal